Shide railway station was at Shide, on the southern fringes of Newport, Isle of Wight, off the south coast of England. It was an intermediate station on the line from Newport to Sandown, which was initially operated by the Isle of Wight (Newport Junction) Railway (incorporated 1868).

History
Shide station opened in 1875 and closed, along with the line itself, in 1956. Situated near Shide Chalk Pits, it was a sparsely used station whose main purpose was to transport raw materials needed for the Island’s cement industry. It was doomed when production ceased during the Second World War. The station site was built over and is now occupied by a warehouse, and the River Medina has since been diverted to flow along the course of the old railway at this point. The old track to the south of the station site is now a cycle route (NCN23).

Stationmasters
George Ranger ca. 1886
Samuel John Urry ca. 1899 ca. 1901 (afterwards station master at Calbourne)
George Hayward ca. 1915

See also 
 List of closed railway stations in Britain

References

External links 
 History of Shide Chalk Pit

Disused railway stations on the Isle of Wight
Former Isle of Wight Central Railway stations
Railway stations in Great Britain opened in 1875
Railway stations in Great Britain closed in 1956
1875 establishments in England
1956 disestablishments in England